Adela of Vermandois  ( – c. 982) was a French noblewoman.  She was Countess of Chalon and later Countess of Anjou.

Adela was a daughter of Robert of Vermandois, Count of Meaux and Troyes, and Adelaide de Burgundy. Adele died in 982.

Family
She married Geoffrey I of Anjou (c. 938/940 – July 21, 987). Their children were:
 Fulk III of Anjou (970-1040), he succeeded his father as Count of Anjou.
 Geoffrey of Anjou (971-977), died young.
 Ermengarde-Gerberga of Anjou, married Conan I of Rennes. She married secondly William II of Angoulême.

Notes

References

Sources

Countesses of Anjou

Counts of Chalon
930s births
980s deaths
Year of birth uncertain
Year of death uncertain